Caladenia aurulenta is a plant in the orchid family Orchidaceae and is endemic to South Australia. It was first formally described in 2005 by David Jones, who gave it the name Arachnorchis aurulenta and published the description in The Orchadian from a specimen collected in the Gawler Ranges. In 2008, Robert Bates changed the name to Caladenia aurulenta. The specific epithet (aurulenta) is a Latin word meaning "golden", "made of gold" or "ornamented with gold". Caladenia aurulenta occurs in the northern part of the Eyre Peninsula.

References

aurulenta
Plants described in 2005
Endemic orchids of Australia
Orchids of South Australia
Taxa named by David L. Jones (botanist)
Taxa named by Robert John Bates